John Castillo may refer to:

John Castillo (poet) (1792–1845), British poet
John Castillo (footballer) (born 1983), Colombian footballer for UES in El Salvador
John Jairo Castillo (born 1984), Colombian footballer for Club Universidad de Guadalajara in Mexico

See also
Juan Castillo (disambiguation)